The 1907 Michigan Agricultural Aggies football team represented Michigan Agricultural College (MAC) as an independent during the 1907 college football season. In their fourth year under head coach Chester Brewer, the Aggies compiled a 4–2–1 record and outscored their opponents 127 to 60.

Schedule

Game summaries

Michigan

On October 12, 1907, the Aggies lost to Michigan by a 46 to 0 score at Ferry Field.  It was the third game in the Michigan - Michigan State football rivalry.  Michigan had won the two prior meetings by a combined score of 158 to 0. In 40 minutes of play, Michigan scored eight touchdowns and did not allow a single first down to be made by the Aggies.  Team captain Paul Magoffin made his first appearance of the season and scored five touchdowns. The game was played in 20-minute halves.

References

Michigan Agricultural
Michigan State Spartans football seasons
Michigan Agricultural Aggies football